Conus madecassinus is a species of predatory sea snail, a marine gastropod mollusc in the family Conidae, the cone snails, cone shells or cones.

Like all species within the genus Conus, these snails are predatory and venomous. They are capable of "stinging" humans, therefore live ones should be handled carefully or not at all.

Description 
The size of the shell attains 32 mm.

Distribution
This marine species occurs off Southern and Southwestern Madagascar.

References

 Bozzetti L. (2012) Two new species of Conidae (Gastropoda: Prosobranchia) from Southern and South-Western Madagascar. Malacologia Mostra Mondiale 74: 4-6

External links 
 

madecassinus
Gastropods described in 2012